Tori & Dean: Cabin Fever is a docu-series starring Tori Spelling, her husband, Dean McDermott, and their four children. The premise of the series is the family heads to Dean's native Ontario, Canada to live and experience cottage country as they renovate a cottage.

References

2010s American reality television series
2014 American television series debuts
2014 American television series endings
Spelling family
Television series by Corus Entertainment